Palais-Sainte-Marguerite is a settlement in Guadeloupe in the commune of Le Moule, on the island of Grande-Terre.  It is located to the east of Sainte-Marguerite and to the west of Lemercier and Le Moule.

Populated places in Guadeloupe